Sacúdete las penas (Shake Off Your Sorrows) is a 2018 drama and musical film directed by Andrés Ibáñez Díaz Infante. The film premiered on 27 April 2018 in Mexico, and is stars Emmanuel Orenday, and Melissa Barrera.

Plot 
González, a prisoner with a long sentence, tells the story of Frituras, the most famous dancer in Mexico City. On a night of revelry, Frituras would lose his freedom, ending at the Palacio de Lecumberri, the most dangerous prison in the country.

Cast 
 Emmanuel Orenday as Pepe González "Frituras"
 Melissa Barrera as Luisa
 Gustavo Sánchez Parra as González
 Arturo Barba as García
 Alejandro Calva as Martín del Campo
 Fernanda Castillo as María
 Begoña Narváez as Eva
 Roberto Sosa as Chávez

Production 
The film was filmed mostly at the San Luis Potosí Arts Center.

References

External links 
 

Mexican musical drama films
2010s musical drama films
2018 drama films
2010s Mexican films